Thomas's of York is a historic pub in the city centre of York, in England.

The building which houses the pub was first constructed in about 1700.  In about 1800, it became part of Ettridge's Royal Hotel, and at some point in the 1820s, it was heightened from two to three storeys.  In 1858, it was bought by William Thomas, an experienced hotellier, who renamed the hotel after himself.  The remainder of the old hotel was demolished, and the Museum Street facade of the remaining building was altered, with work completed in 1863.  Thomas sold the pub in 1876, to Thomas Lightfoot, a brewer from Bedale, but its name was retained.  In 1900, it was purchased by John Smith's Brewery.  At the time, it had eight bedrooms, a bar, two drawing rooms, a coffee room and a billiard room.

The building is constructed of dark brown brick.  The staircase and some first floor doors are original, while the fireplaces and some plaster work date from the 1863 alterations.  There is late 19th century stained glass around the wide door, with a colourful design in the tympanum above, incorporating the name "Thomas's Hotel".

The pub was grade II listed in 1978.  By 2022, it was owned by the Stonegate Pub Company, which closed it for conversion into a Be At One cocktail bar.

References

External links

Museum Street (York)
Grade II listed pubs in York